The Social Security Contributions and Benefits Act 1992 (c 4) is the primary legislation concerning the state retirement provision, accident insurance, statutory sick pay and maternity pay in the United Kingdom.

Contents
Part I Contributions
Part II Contributory benefits
Part III Non-contributory benefits
Part IV Increases for dependants
Part V Benefit for industrial injuries
Part VI Miscellaneous provisions relating to Parts I to V
Part VII Income-related benefits
Part VIII The Social Fund
Part IX Child Benefit
Part X Christmas bonus for pensioners
Part XI Statutory sick pay
Part XII Statutory maternity pay (ss 164-171)
Part XIII General

Schedules
Schedule 1 Supplementary provisions relating to contributions of Classes 1, 1A, 2 and 3.
Schedule 2 Levy of Class 4 contributions with income tax.
Schedule 3 Contribution conditions for entitlement to benefit.
Schedule 4 Rates of benefits, etc.
Schedule 5 Increase of pension where entitlement is deferred.
Schedule 6 Assessment of extent of disablement.
Schedule 7 Industrial injuries benefits.
Schedule 8 Industrial injuries and diseases (old cases).
Schedule 9 Exclusions from entitlement to child benefit.
Schedule 10 Priority between persons entitled to child benefit.
Schedule 11 Circumstances in which periods of entitlement to statutory sick pay do not arise.
Schedule 12 Relationship of statutory sick pay with benefits and other payments, etc.
Schedule 13 Relationship of statutory maternity pay with benefits and other payments etc.

See also
UK labour law
Pensions in the United Kingdom
Pensions Act 1995

External links
 Data

Pensions in the United Kingdom
United Kingdom Acts of Parliament 1992
Social security in the United Kingdom